Ella Dee Kessel Caperton (February 26, 1943 – September 1, 2000), best known as Dee Kessel Caperton, was a First Lady of West Virginia and Miss West Virginia. She was the ex-wife of former West Virginia Governor Gaston Caperton, and the daughter of former Jackson County Circuit Court Judge and West Virginia Supreme Court Justice Oliver Kessel.

A Ripley, West Virginia native, she held a degree in music from West Virginia University, a master's degree in education from the West Virginia College of Graduate Studies, and a Doctorate in Education from the University of Pittsburgh. She was Miss West Virginia 1964 and the second runner up in the Miss America pageant.  She married Caperton in 1965. Two sons were born of the marriage, W.G. (Gat) Caperton, and John Kessel Caperton.

After working as an interior decorator, studying classical music, and learning how to fly an airplane, in 1986 Kessel Caperton was elected to the West Virginia House of Delegates for a two-year term.  She did not seek reelection in 1988, in order to campaign statewide for Caperton's campaign for governor.  After becoming First Lady in 1989, she became the first First Lady of West Virginia to have her own office in the State Capitol.  As First Lady she focused on education, children and women's issues.

In 1990, after divorcing Caperton, she created national headlines when she announced her candidacy for State Treasurer of West Virginia that year. After losing the Treasurer's race, she moved to France, where she operated a small hotel in Saint-Remy. She died in France on September 1, 2000, aged 57.

References 

1943 births
2000 deaths
Beauty pageant contestants from West Virginia
First Ladies and Gentlemen of West Virginia
Democratic Party members of the West Virginia House of Delegates
Miss America 1960s delegates
Miss America Preliminary Swimsuit winners
People from Ripley, West Virginia
University of Pittsburgh alumni
West Virginia University alumni
Women state legislators in West Virginia
American expatriates in France
Caperton family of Virginia and West Virginia
20th-century American politicians
20th-century American women politicians